Langø is an island in Denmark. It is situated in the Ulvsund between Sjælland and Møn.

Islands of Denmark
Geography of Vordingborg Municipality